"Asking too Much" is a song by American heavy metal band All That Remains. The song was released as a single from their sixth album, A War You Cannot Win, on March 18, 2013, and a music video was released to YouTube on April 30, 2013. In the U.S., it peaked at number fourteen on the Mainstream Rock Tracks chart.

Music video
The video opens with a woman coming home to find her boyfriend cheating on her with his mistress. Jilted, the woman argues with her boyfriend, asking him how could he commit such a betrayal to her as they seemed happily in love together. As the boyfriend denies what is going on between him and his mistress, the woman begins to verbally and physically attack her boyfriend's mistress by engaging in a fist-fight, prompting the boyfriend to step between both women and end the fight to prevent further damage. However, the jilted woman is then shown in the bathroom with tears in her eyes and her mascara running down her face as she writes down the song's lyrics on a piece of paper hinted to be a suicide note to be read to her cheating boyfriend. As she stares hopelessly in the mirror at herself, flashbacks show the woman and her boyfriend in a seemingly blissful and promising relationship, walking through a park and then moving into an apartment together before his infidelity.

During the next verse of the song, a blonde, teenage girl is shown walking down a street with her boyfriend, both seem to be happy together and having a good time. However, she comes home late one night to find that her boyfriend has committed suicide, lying in the bathtub with both his wrists slit with a razor blade. As the teenage girl sobs uncontrollably while mourning her boyfriend, flashbacks show the teen couple walking through a park, sitting on a rock kissing and holding hands and then sitting side by side in a children's park playground set talking to each other. Flashbacks then depict the young man was secretly struggling with depression for unknown reasons as he is lying on his bed writing down the song's lyrics on a sheet of paper in the form of a suicide note, then attempting to sleep in his bed, and is shown next crying in front of a mirror while looking at his reflection. Finally, the young man is shown slitting his wrists in the bathtub and bleeding to death whilst taking a shower, before his girlfriend's arrival home.

The final chorus shows both women walking through the same park where they shared strolls and conversations with their respective lovers. As the video comes to an end, both women in mourning of their lovers pass each other on the same lane but don't stop to console each other nor get to know one another and keep walking away dejected just before the screen fades to black.

Track listing

References

2013 singles
All That Remains (band) songs
2013 songs
Songs written by Rob Graves
Razor & Tie singles
Songs written by Jason Costa
Songs written by Philip Labonte
Alternative metal songs